Desu or DESU may refer to:

 Desu (Japanese: です), the polite form of the Japanese copula often translated as "to be"
 Adalbert Deșu (Béla Dezső, 1909–1937), a Romanian football striker
 Delaware State University, sometimes abbreviated as DESU
 Diplôme d'études supérieures universitaires (DESU), a French academic grade